Emerson Carlysle Norton (November 16, 1900 in Kansas City, Kansas – March 10, 1986 in Sanford, Florida) is an American athlete who competed mainly in the decathlon. He competed for the United States in the 1924 Summer Olympics held in Paris, France in the decathlon where he won the silver medal.

References

External links

1900 births
1986 deaths
American male decathletes
Olympic silver medalists for the United States in track and field
Athletes (track and field) at the 1924 Summer Olympics
People from Seminole, Florida
Medalists at the 1924 Summer Olympics
Olympic decathletes